Pentidotea kirchanskii is species of crustacean in the family Idoteidae. It was first described by M.A. Miller & Lee.

Geographic range 
Found along the coast of California in the Northern Pacific, usually documented between San Jose and San Diego.

Habitats 
This isopod is found in the high intertidal zone; Benthic.

Mobility 
It uses drag powered swimming and walking to get around.

Biology 
These organisms are bilaterally symmetric, and multicellular as they a member of the Animalia kingdom.

Mating behavior 
Sperm transfer is indirect, females hold eggs in pouch until spawning.

References

External links 
 Image library

Valvifera